Source Direct is an English drum and bass act from St Albans, Hertfordshire, England. Source Direct have released an EP, Controlled Developments (1997), an album, Exorcise the Demons (1999), as well as numerous singles, under both the Source Direct name and a number of aliases.

Originally Source Direct consisted of James Baker and Phil Aslett, later becoming a solo project of Baker's in 1999.

History
Originally the act consisted of two childhood friends, James Baker and Phil Aslett. Due to differences between the pair however, it became entirely a solo project of Baker's in 1999, after the release of Exorcise the Demons.

Source Direct's music uses complex and irregular breakbeats, snappy and precise hi-hats, dark atmospheric sampling and abstract song structures.

Source Direct have released music on a variety of record labels: Metalheadz, Science (Virgin Records), Good Looking Records, Astralwerks, Basement, Certificate 18, Odysee, Street Beats and the self-owned Source Direct Recordings. They have released singles under the names Intensity, Sounds of Life, Oblivion, Mirage, X-Files and Hokusai.

Despite not being featured on the officially released soundtrack, Source Direct gained recognition for the track "Call & Response" which was used in the horror movie Blade. The track, originally a single, was later included on their EP Controlled Developments, and on their album Exorcise the Demons. Source Direct contributed the track "2097" to the CD soundtrack of the PlayStation game Wipeout 2097, released in 1996.

Fact included Exorcise the Demons in its "The 100 Best Albums of the 1990s".

Discography

Albums and EPs
 Controlled Developments (1997, Astralwerks) – 6-track EP
 Exorcise the Demons (1999, Virgin Records)

Singles
 "Future London/Shimmer" (1994, Odysee)
 "A Made Up Sound/The Cult" (1995, Metalheadz)
 "Approach & Identify/Modem" (1995, Source Direct)
 "Different Groove/Stars" (1995, Odysee)
 "Fabric of Space/Bliss" (1995, Source Direct)
 "Snake Style/Exit 9" (1995, Source Direct)
 "Black Rose/12 Til 4" (1996, Source Direct)
 "Stonekiller/Web of Sin" (1996, Metalheadz)
 "The Crane/Artificial Barriers" (1996, Source Direct)
 "Call & Response/Computer State" (1997, Virgin)
 "Capital D/Enemy Lines" (1997, Virgin)
 "Two Masks/Black Domina" (1997, Virgin)
 "Concealed Identity" (1998, Virgin)
 "Mind Weaver" (1998, Virgin)
 "Technical Warfare" (1998, Virgin)
 "Snowblind/The Place" (2001, Demonic)
 "Sub One/Escape From Cairo" (2001, Demonic)
 "Yo Bitch!/Pimp Star" (2001, Demonic)

References

External links
 
 
 
 Source Direct AllMusic Discography
 Source Direct at BBC Music

British DJs
Club DJs
Electronic dance music DJs
English drum and bass musicians
Drum and bass musicians
Breakbeat musicians
English electronic musicians
English record producers
Remixers
Living people
People from St Albans
Year of birth missing (living people)
Musical groups from St Albans